This is a list of famous people who were born or have lived in Osijek, Croatia.

Artists, musicians and actors
Viktor Axmann (1878-1946), (architect)
Zlatko Burić (born 1953), (Croatian-Danish actor)
Petra Cicvarić (born 1986), (actress)
Bela Čikoš Sesija (1864-1931), (painter, one among the first representatives of symbolism (secesija, art nouveau) in Croatia)
Slobodanka Čolović (born 1965), (athlete, who competed at the 1988 Summer Olympics, finishing fourth, and a gold at the 1987 Mediterranean Games)
Mia Dimšić (born 1992), (singer, who will represent Croatia in the Eurovision Song Contest 2022)
Andrej Dojkic (born 1980), (actor)
Zvonimir Jurić (born 1971), (film and TV director)
Julije Knifer (1924-2004), (painter)
Franjo Krežma (1862-1881), (violinist)
Branko Lustig (1932-2019), (Hollywood producer and winner of two Oscars)
Branko Mihaljević (1931-2005), (composer), spent his career in Osijek and died in Osijek
Oliver Mlakar (born 1935), (TV anchor)
Oscar Nemon (1906-1985), (sculptor)
Aklea Neon (born 1990), (singer)
Zlatko Pejaković (born 1950), (singer)
Slava Raškaj (1877-1906), (painter)
Ivan Rein (1905-1943), (painter)
Rod Riffler (1907-1941), (modern dance teacher and choreographer)
Sigmund Romberg (1887-1951), (composer), studied in Osijek (Osijek gymnasium)
Zdenka Rubinstein (1911-1961), (operatic soprano)
Branko Schmidt (born 1957), (film director)
Krunoslav Slabinac (1944-2020), (popular singer)
Miroslav Škoro (born 1962), (singer and composer)
Dado Topić (born 1949), (singer)
Adolf Waldinger (1843-1904), (19th-century painter)

Authors
Maja Bošković-Stulli (1922-2012), (historian, writer, publisher and academic)
Borivoj Dovniković (1930-2022), (film director, animator, caricaturist, illustrator and graphic designer)
Drago Hedl (born 1950), (journalist, editor of Feral Tribune, winner of the Knight International Journalism Award in 2006)
Vladimir Herzog (1937-1975), (Brazilian TV journalist, university professor and theater author)
Vane Ivanović (1913-1999), (athlete, political activist and writer)
Matija Petar Katančić (1750–1825), (18th-century writer, university professor for archaeology, translator of the Bible in the Croatian, author of the first paper over the archaeology in Croatia)
Zlatko Krilić (born 1955), (writer and the president of the Croatian Writers' Association)
Viktor Sonnenfeld (1902-1969), (translator and philosopher)

Politicians
 Biljana Borzan (born 1971), (member of the European Parliament and member of the Social Democratic Party of Croatia)
 Josip Frank (1844-1911), (lawyer and politician)
 Vilim Herman (born 1949), (former representative in the Croatian Parliament for Croatian Social Liberal Party)
 Branimir Glavaš (born 1956), (right-wing politician) 
 Ivan Rikard Ivanović (1880–1949), (politician and industrialist)
 Zlatko Kramarić (born 1956), (liberal politician and former mayor)
 Vladimir Šeks (born 1943), (President (Speaker) of the Croatian Parliament)
 Vesna Škare Ožbolt (born 1961), (leader of the Democratic Centre political party)
 Daniel Srb (born 1964), (politician)

Scientists
Branko Grünbaum (1929-2018), (mathematician and professor)
Snježana Kordić (born 1964), (Croatian linguist)
Andrija Mohorovičić (1857-1936), (meteorologist and seismologist born in Volosko, Istria)
Vladimir Prelog (1906-1998), (chemist, Nobel prize winner, born in Sarajevo, Bosnia and Herzegovina) 
Lavoslav (Leopold) Ružička (1887-1976), (chemist, Nobel prize winner; born in nearby Vukovar and attended famous Osijek high school/gymnasium )

Athletes 
Marko Babić (born 1981), (footballer)
Nenad Bjelica (born 1971), (footballer)
Igor Cvitanović (born 1970), (footballer)
Jelena Dokić (born 1983), (Australian tennis player, former #4 on WTA)
Marko Dugandžić (born 1994), (footballer)
Kosta Perović (born 1985), (Serbian basketball player; first basketball player born in Osijek to be drafted into NBA)
Alen Petrović (born 1969), (footballer)
Jasna Šekarić (born 1965), (Serbian sport shooter; winner of one gold, three silver and one bronze medal at Olympic games; winner of International Shooting Sport Federation "Shooter of the Millennium" award)
Robert Špehar (born 1970), (footballer)
Davor Šuker (born 1968), (footballer, winner of Golden Boot at 1998 FIFA World Cup)
Saša Vasiljević (born 1979), (Bosnian basketball player)
Donna Vekić (born 1996), (tennis player)
Jurica Vranješ (born 1980), (footballer)

Other
Tatjana Aparac-Jelušić (born 1948), (librarian)
Jovan Četirević Grabovan (1720–1781), (icon painter)
Igor Ćutuk (born 1976), (journalist)
Zora Dirnbach (1929-2019), (journalist and writer)
Francis, Duke of Teck (1837-1900), (German Prince, great grandfather of Queen Elizabeth II)
Mirko Hermann (1868-1927), (industrialist, businessman, banker and member of the Freemasonry in Osijek)
Slavko Hirsch (1893-1942), (physician, founder and director of the Epidemiological Institute in Osijek)
Mihajlo Klajn (1912-1941), (agronomist and communist killed during the Holocaust)
Arnold Kohn (1905-1984), (Zionist and longtime president of the Jewish community Osijek)
Franjo Šeper (1905-1981), (Archbishop of Zagreb from 1960 to 1968, and Prefect of the Congregation for the Doctrine of the Faith from 1968 to 1981)
Ferdo Šišić (1869-1940), (historian)
Josip Juraj Strossmayer (1815-1905), (Maecenas bishop)
Simon Ungar (1864-1942), (rabbi of the Osijek Jewish community)
Miroslav Volf (born 1956), (Christian theologian)
Branko Vukelić (1904-1945), (spy working for Richard Sorge's spy ring in Japan)

References

External links

 
Osijek